Vlasti (before 1927: Βλάτση - Vlatsi) is a village and a community of the Eordaia municipality. Before the 2011 local government reform it was an independent community. The 2011 census recorded 274 inhabitants in the village. The community of Vlasti covers an area of 72.089 km2.

History
The first settlement was established in the 15th century and received an influx of Vlach refugees from Grammos and Moschopoli in the 18th century. The public buildings and the houses which still today adorn Vlasti reflect the flourishing of this village in the 19th century.

According to the statistics of Vasil Kanchov ("Macedonia, Ethnography and Statistics"), 1.300 Vlachs and 1.200 Greek Christians lived in the village in 1900.

Geography
Located at the heart of western Macedonia, it is girdled by the massifs of Mt Mouriki which serves as a home not only to the brown bear (Ursus arctos), but also to a large number of rare birds, including the short-toed eagle (Circaetus gallicus), the Egyptian vulture (Neophron percnopterus) and the long-legged buzzard (Buteo rufinus).

Tourism
The village bustles with life in summer as it is then that the Earth Festival is organized. It comprises a series of ecological and at the same time joyful events whose objective is to inform and sensitize people showing them the need to respect natural environment. Moreover, visitors have the chance to come into contact with the locals, experience their hospitality and participate with them in these jolly festivities. Vlasti serves a starting point for fascinating, enjoyable routes either to Mt Mouriki and its shelter or to neighbouring regions. There is good infrastructure to support the touristic development of the place with hotels, restaurants and bars.

Notable natives
 Konstantinos Dosios, lawyer and politician

See also
List of settlements in the Kozani regional unit

References

Populated places in Kozani (regional unit)
Former municipalities in Western Macedonia
Aromanian settlements in Greece